Joe Huff (March 21, 1906 Fort Wayne, Indiana – August 21, 1971 Indianapolis, Indiana) was an American racecar driver.

Indianapolis 500 results

References

1906 births
1971 deaths
Indianapolis 500 drivers
Racing drivers from Indiana
Sportspeople from Fort Wayne, Indiana